Óscar García Guerrero (born 12 July 1988) is a Spanish footballer who plays for CD Huétor Vega as a striker.

Club career
García was born in Granada, Andalusia. A product of Málaga CF's youth ranks, he made his debut with the first team on 13 January 2010, in a Copa del Rey match against Getafe CF (5–1 away loss, 6–3 on aggregate). He spent nearly four full seasons with the reserves in the Tercera División, also playing six Segunda División B matches in 2006–07 and scoring twice in a relegation-ending campaign.

In the summer of 2010, after failing to appear in the league for Málaga during his four-year senior spell, García signed with CD Leganés of division three. He finished the season with another side in that tier, Ontinyent CF, then moved to CD San Roque de Lepe in the ensuing off-season.

García joined FC Kairat in Kazakhstan on 12 July 2012. One year later, after a brief stint in his country with lowly Loja CD, he moved abroad again, signing with IF Birkebeineren in Norway's third division alongside compatriot Jorge Pina. In July 2015 he transferred to another team in the latter competition, Raufoss IL, from Auckland City FC in the New Zealand Football Championship.

After another year in the Norwegian third division, now with Egersunds IK, García returned to his homeland and signed with SD Leioa also in that tier. For 2018–19, he agreed to a contract at UD Melilla.

Club statistics

Honours
Auckland City
New Zealand Football Championship: 2014–15
OFC Champions League: 2014–15

References

External links

1988 births
Living people
Spanish footballers
Footballers from Granada
Association football forwards
Segunda División B players
Tercera División players
Segunda Federación players
Tercera Federación players
Atlético Malagueño players
Málaga CF players
CD Leganés players
Ontinyent CF players
CD San Roque de Lepe footballers
SD Leioa players
UD Melilla footballers
Marbella FC players
CD El Ejido players
Kazakhstan Premier League players
FC Kairat players
Moss FK players
Raufoss IL players
Egersunds IK players
New Zealand Football Championship players
Auckland City FC players
Spanish expatriate footballers
Expatriate footballers in Kazakhstan
Expatriate footballers in Norway
Expatriate association footballers in New Zealand
Spanish expatriate sportspeople in Kazakhstan
Spanish expatriate sportspeople in Norway
Spanish expatriate sportspeople in New Zealand